Clinch may refer to:

 Nail (fastener) or device to hold in this way
 Clinching, in metalworking
 Clinch fighting or the clinch, a grappling position in boxing or wrestling, a stand-up embrace
 Clinch County, Georgia, USA
 Clinch River, near Tazewell, Virginia, USA
 Clinch & Co Brewery, an English brewery founded in 1811
 Clinch & Co Brewery (Isle of Man)

People
 Danny Clinch (born 1964), photographer and film director
 Duncan Lamont Clinch (1787–1849), American army officer
 Gavin Clinch (born 1974), rugby league footballer
 John Clinch (cricketer) (born 1967), English cricketer

See also